Zui or ZUI may refer to :

Places 
 local dialect name of Zuglio, in Udine province, Friuli-Venezia Giulia autonomous region, northeastern Italy 

Acronyms
 Zooming user interface 

Other
 "Zui", a 2001 album by Showtaro Morikubo
 "Zui.com", a video and gaming website for children that only shows suitable videos
 "ZUI", Military and amateur radio short hand for "I wish to draw your attention to ......."